Jiske Griffioen and Aniek van Koot defeated the defending champions Yui Kamiji and Jordanne Whiley in a rematch of the previous year's final, 7–6(7–1), 3–6, [10–8] to win the women's doubles wheelchair tennis title at the 2015 French Open.

Seeds

Draw

Finals

References
 Draw

Wheelchair Women's Doubles
French Open, 2015 Women's Doubles